Swanson is a settlement and unincorporated place in the Unorganized North Part of Algoma District, northeastern Ontario, Canada. It lies at the south end of Esnagi Lake on the Magpie River where the Canadian Pacific Railway transcontinental main line crosses the river, between the settlements of Ryerson on the line  to the west and Franz, the junction of the CPR with the Algoma Central Railway,  to the east. Canadian Pacific Railway has built, operates and maintains a signalled siding at Swanson as part of their White River Subdivision. The signals and switches at Swanson and other signalled siding locations on the White River Subdivision are under Centralized Traffic Control (CTC), a train control system operated by a Rail Traffic Controller situated in the Canadian Pacific Railway headquarters in Calgary, Alberta. Via Rail provides passenger train services with the Sudbury – White River train.

A small dam controls the outflow on the Magpie River from Esnagi Lake, and a small creek enters from the right just upstream of the dam.

References

Communities in Algoma District